Shire is a traditional term for an administrative division of land in Great Britain and some other English-speaking countries such as Australia. It is generally synonymous with county. It was first used in Wessex from the beginning of Anglo-Saxon settlement, and spread to most of the rest of England in the tenth century. In some rural parts of Australia, a shire is a local government area; however, in Australia it is not synonymous with a "county", which is a lands administrative division.

Etymology

The word shire derives from the Old English , from the Proto-Germanic , denoting an 'official charge' a 'district under a governor', and a 'care'. In the UK, shire became synonymous with county, an administrative term introduced to England through the Norman Conquest in the later part of the eleventh century. In contemporary British usage, the word counties also refers to shires, mainly in places such as Shire Hall.

In regions with rhotic pronunciation, such as Scotland, the word shire is pronounced ; in areas of non-rhotic pronunciation, the final R is silent, unless the next word begins in a vowel sound.

Origins
The system was first used in the kingdom of Wessex from the beginning of Anglo-Saxon settlement, and spread to most of the rest of England in the tenth century, along with the West Saxon kingdom's political domination. In Domesday (1086) the city of York was divided into shires. The first shires of Scotland were created in English-settled areas such as Lothian and the Borders, in the ninth century. King David I more consistently created shires and appointed sheriffs across lowland shores of Scotland.

The shire in early days was governed by an ealdorman and in the later Anglo-Saxon period by a royal official known as a "shire reeve" or sheriff. The shires were divided into hundreds or wapentakes, although other less common sub-divisions existed.  An alternative name for a shire was a "sheriffdom" until sheriff court reforms separated the two concepts. The phrase "shire county" applies, unofficially, to non-metropolitan counties in England, specifically those that are not local unitary authority areas. In Scotland the word "county" was not adopted for the shires.  Although "county" appears in some texts, "shire" was the normal name until counties for statutory purposes were created in the nineteenth century. In Ireland "shire" was not used for the counties.

In most cases, the "shire town" is the seat of the shire's government, or was historically. Sometimes the nomenclature exists even where "county" is used in place of "shire" as in, for instance, Kentville in Nova Scotia.

Shires in the United Kingdom 

"Shire" also refers, in a narrower sense, to ancient counties with names that ended in "shire". These counties are typically (though not always) named after their county town. The suffix -shire is attached to most of the names of English, Scottish and Welsh counties.  It tends not to be found in the names of shires that were pre-existing divisions. Essex, Kent, and Sussex, for example, have never borne a -shire, as each represents a former Anglo-Saxon kingdom.  Similarly Cornwall was a British kingdom before it became an English county. The term "shire" is not used in the names of the six traditional counties of Northern Ireland.

Shire names in England
Counties in England bearing the "-shire" suffix comprise: Bedfordshire, Berkshire, Buckinghamshire, Cambridgeshire, Cheshire, Derbyshire, Gloucestershire, Hampshire, Herefordshire, Hertfordshire, Huntingdonshire, Lancashire, Lincolnshire, Leicestershire, Northamptonshire, Nottinghamshire, Oxfordshire, Shropshire, Staffordshire, Warwickshire, Wiltshire, Worcestershire and Yorkshire. These counties, on their historical boundaries, cover a little more than half the area of England. The counties that do not use "-shire" are mainly in three areas, in the south-east, south-west and far north of England. Several of these counties no longer exist as administrative units, or have had their administrative boundaries reduced by local government reforms. Several of the successor authorities retain the "-shire" county names, such as North Yorkshire, East Yorkshire, South Yorkshire, West Yorkshire, and South Gloucestershire.

The county of Devon was historically known as Devonshire, although this is no longer the official name. Indeed, it was retained by the Devonshire and Dorset Regiment until amalgamation in 2007. Similarly, Dorset, Rutland and Somerset were formerly known as Dorsetshire, Rutlandshire and Somersetshire, but these terms are no longer official, and are rarely used outside the local populations.

Hexhamshire was a county in the north-east of England from the early 12th century until 1572, when it was incorporated into Northumberland.

Shire names in Scotland
In Scotland, barely affected by the Norman conquest of England, the word "shire" prevailed over "county" until the 19th century. Earliest sources have the same usage of the "-shire" suffix as in England (though in Scots this was oftenmost "schyr").  Later the "Shire" appears as a separate word.

"Shire" names in Scotland comprise Aberdeenshire, Ayrshire, Banffshire, Berwickshire, Clackmannanshire, Cromartyshire, Dumfriesshire, Dunbartonshire, Inverness-shire, Kincardineshire, Kinross-shire, Kirkcudbrightshire, Lanarkshire, Morayshire, Nairnshire, Peeblesshire, Perthshire, Renfrewshire, Ross-shire, Roxburghshire, Selkirkshire, Stirlingshire, and Wigtownshire. 	

In Scotland four shires have alternative names with the "-shire" suffix: Angus (Forfarshire), East Lothian (Haddingtonshire), Midlothian (Edinburghshire) and West Lothian (Linlithgowshire).

Sutherland is occasionally still referred to as Sutherlandshire. Similarly, Argyllshire, Buteshire, Caithness-shire and Fifeshire are sometimes found. Also, Morayshire was previously called Elginshire. There is debate about whether Argyllshire was ever really used.

Shire names in Wales
Shires in Wales bearing the "-shire" suffix (Sir preceding the name in Welsh) comprise: Brecknockshire (or Breconshire), Caernarfonshire (historically Carnarvonshire), Cardiganshire (in Welsh- Ceredigion), Carmarthenshire, Denbighshire, Flintshire, Monmouthshire, Montgomeryshire, Pembrokeshire, and Radnorshire. In Wales, the counties of Merioneth and Glamorgan are occasionally referred to with the "shire" suffix. The only traditional Welsh county that never takes "shire" in English is Anglesey; in Welsh it is referred to as 'Sir Fôn'.

Non-county "shires"
The suffix "-shire" could be a generalised term referring to a district. It did not acquire the strong association with county until later. Other than these, the term was used for several other districts. Bedlingtonshire, Craikshire, Norhamshire and Islandshire were exclaves of County Durham, which were incorporated into Northumberland or Yorkshire in 1844. The suffix was also used for many hundreds, wapentakes and liberties such as Allertonshire, Blackburnshire, Halfshire, Howdenshire, Leylandshire, Powdershire, Pydarshire, Richmondshire, Riponshire, Salfordshire, Triggshire, Tynemouthshire, West Derbyshire and Wivelshire, counties corporate such as Hullshire, and other districts such as Applebyshire, Bamburghshire, Bunkleshire, Carlisleshire, Coldinghamshire, Coxwoldshire, Cravenshire, Hallamshire, Mashamshire and Yetholmshire. Richmondshire is today the name of a local government district of North Yorkshire.

Non-county shires were very common in Scotland. Kinross-shire and Clackmannanshire are arguably survivals from such districts. Non-county "shires" in Scotland include Bunkleshire, Coldinghamshire and Yetholmshire.

Shires in Australia
"Shire" is the most common word in Australia for rural local government areas (LGAs). New South Wales, Victoria, Queensland, Western Australia and the Northern Territory use the term "shire" for this unit; the territories of Christmas Island and Cocos Island are also shires. In contrast, South Australia uses district and region for its rural LGA units, while Tasmania uses municipality. Shires are generally functionally indistinguishable from towns, borough, municipalities, or cities.

Three LGAs in outer metropolitan Sydney and four in outer metropolitan Melbourne have populations exceeding that of towns or municipalities, but retain significant bushlands and/or semi-rural areas, and most have continued to use "shire" in their titles whilst others have dropped it from theirs. These "city-shires" are:

Sydney:
 Sutherland Shire (which is locally referred to as "The Shire")
 The Hills Shire ("The Garden Shire", previously "Baulkham Hills Shire")
 Hornsby Shire ("The Bushland Shire")

Melbourne:
 Shire of Nillumbik ("The Green Wedge Shire")
 Shire of Yarra Ranges
 Shire of Cardinia
 Shire of Mornington Peninsula (which is locally known as "The Peninsula")
 Shire of Pakenham (1862-1994)

Shires in the United States

Virginia
In 1634, eight "shires" were created in the Virginia Colony by order of Charles I, King of England. They were renamed as counties only a few years later. They were:

 Accomac Shire (since 1642 Northampton County, Virginia)
 Charles City Shire (since 1637 Charles City County, Virginia)
 Charles River Shire (since 1643 York County, Virginia)
 Elizabeth City Shire (became Elizabeth City County, Virginia in 1643)
 Henrico Shire (later became Henrico County, Virginia)
 James City Shire (about 1642-43 James City County, Virginia)
 Warwick River Shire  (became consolidated with the City of Newport News, Virginia)
 Warrosquyoake Shire (became Isle of Wight County, Virginia)

Today, the concept of a "Shire" still exists in Virginia code. It is defined as a semi-autonomous subdivision of a consolidated City-County. Currently no Shires exist in the commonwealth and the administrative provision is largely unknown.

New York and New England
Before the Province of New York was granted county subdivisions and a greater royal presence in 1683, the early ducal colony consisted of York Shire, as well as Albany and Ulster, after the three titles held by Prince James: Duke of York, Duke of Albany, Earl of Ulster.  While these were basically renamed Dutch core settlements, they were quickly converted to English purposes, while the Dutch remained within the colony, as opposed to later practice of the Acadian Expulsion.  Further Anglo-Dutch synthesis occurred when Prince James enacted the Dominion of New England and later when William III of England took over through the Glorious Revolution.

The word also survives in the name of the state of New Hampshire, whose co-founder, John Mason, named his Province of New Hampshire after the English county of Hampshire.

See also 
 Comarca
 Comarcas of Spain
 Comarques of Catalonia
 Counties of England
 Counties of Scotland
 Counties of Wales
 Counties of the United Kingdom
 Gau

References

Types of administrative division
Place name element etymologies
English suffixes